The 1906 Cincinnati Reds season was a season in American baseball. The team finished sixth in the National League with a record of 64–87, 51½ games behind the Chicago Cubs.

Regular season 
The Reds were coming off their fourth consecutive winning season in 1905, as they had a 79–74 record, however, the team finished in fifth place, twenty-six games behind the pennant winning New York Giants.

Cincinnati made a number of moves in the off-season, including replacing Joe Kelley as manager with Ned Hanlon.  Kelley would remain with the Reds as an outfielder.  Hanlon had previously managed the Brooklyn Superbas from 1899–1905, leading them to the National League pennant in 1899 and 1900.  Hanlon also managed the Baltimore Orioles from 1892–1898, leading them to three straight NL pennants from 1894–1896.

The Reds traded away third baseman Harry Steinfeldt to the Chicago Cubs for pitcher Jake Weimer.  Weimer had a record of 18–12 with a 2.26 ERA in 33 games with the Cubs in 1905 after recording two straight twenty win seasons in 1903 and 1904.  The team also traded away infielder Al Bridwell to the Boston Beaneaters for third baseman Jim Delahanty and pitcher Chick Fraser.  Delahanty hit .255 with five homers and 55 RBI with Boston in 1905, while Fraser had a 14–21 record with a 3.28 ERA in his only season with the Beaneaters.

The team had a poor start to the season, as Cincinnati had a 10–20 record after thirty games, sitting in seventh place, 11.5 games behind the Chicago Cubs.  A six-game winning streak brought the Reds up to fifth place, however, a 2–11 skid in their next thirteen games dropped Cincinnati back to seventh place, 15.5 games behind the Cubs.  As Cincinnati was dropping out of the pennant race, the team made some trades, dealing pitcher Orval Overall to the Cubs for pitcher Bob Wicker and $2,000, trading outfielder Cy Seymour to the Giants for $12,000, and trading away infielder Shad Barry and pitcher Carl Druhot for outfielder Homer Smoot.  Cincinnati finished the season with a 64–87 record, their first losing season since 1901, finishing 51.5 games behind first place Chicago.

Miller Huggins had another solid season at second base, leading the team with a .292 batting average, 159 hits and 81 runs.  Catcher Admiral Schlei had a break out season, hitting .245 with a team high four homers and 54 RBI.

On the mound, Jake Weimer anchored the staff, going 20–14 with a 2.22 ERA in 41 games, starting 39 of them.  Bob Ewing went 13–14 with a 2.38 ERA in 33 games, striking out a team high 145 batters.

Season standings

Record vs. opponents

Roster

Player stats

Batting

Starters by position 
Note: Pos = Position; G = Games played; AB = At bats; H = Hits; Avg. = Batting average; HR = Home runs; RBI = Runs batted in

Other batters 
Note: G = Games played; AB = At bats; H = Hits; Avg. = Batting average; HR = Home runs; RBI = Runs batted in

Pitching

Starting pitchers 
Note: G = Games pitched; IP = Innings pitched; W = Wins; L = Losses; ERA = Earned run average; SO = Strikeouts

Other pitchers 
Note: G = Games pitched; IP = Innings pitched; W = Wins; L = Losses; ERA = Earned run average; SO = Strikeouts

Relief pitchers 
Note: G = Games pitched; W = Wins; L = Losses; SV = Saves; ERA = Earned run average; SO = Strikeouts

References 
1906 Cincinnati Reds season at Baseball Reference

Cincinnati Reds seasons
Cincinnati Reds season
Cincinnati Reds